al-Bikai'a also spelled al-Buqei'a is a Palestinian village cluster in the Tubas Governorate that includes the three hamlets of Khirbet al-'Atuf, al-Hadidiyah, and Khirbet Humsa al-Fawqa. The area spans 29,250 dunams, most of which is covered by Khirbet al-'Atuf. It is situated on a flat plain surrounded by mountains and with an altitude of 50 meters above sea level. The total population of al-Bikai'a was 227 in 1997 and 1,850 in 2005. According to the Palestinian Central Bureau of Statistics, al-Hadidya had a population of 183 inhabitants.

The Abu Bakr as-Sadiq Mosque is the only mosque in al-Bikai'a and is located in Khirbet al-'Atuf. There is one school, and one kindergarten. Most residents go to nearby Tammun for education. About 72.3% of the inhabitants are literate with women comprising nearly two-thirds of the literate population. Agriculture constitutes 95% of the labor force while the remaining 5% work in Israeli construction.

History
Al-Bikai'a has been settled since the Ottoman era of rule in Palestine. The villages in the area were abandoned including one named al-Sakaif. Eventually Arabs from nearby Tammun, mainly the Bani Odeh and Bsharat families settled in the area. Khirbet al-'Atuf was named after 'Atif, an Ayyubid soldier who died during the Crusades and al-Hadidiya was named after its black soil.

Government
Khirbet al-'Atuf is the only locality in the al-Bikai'a cluster that has a governing committee. It consists of four elected members and one paid employee. Its responsibilities include purchasing and distributing water to its residents, opening roads and providing electricity to the residents.

References

External links
Survey of Western Palestine, 1880 Map, Map 12: IAA, Wikimedia commons 

Villages in the West Bank